Love Impossible, also translated Love of South and North, is a 2003 South Korean romantic comedy, starring Kim Sa-rang, Jo In-sung and directed by Jung Cho-shin.

Cast 
 Kim Sa-rang as Oh Young-hee
 Jo In-sung as Kim Chul-soo
  as Seo Hye-young
 Hwangbo as Hye-mi
  as Jo Ho-chul
 Jo Hye-ryun as Night blue marine
 Lee Hang-na as Professor Yeon Byeon-dae
 Kim Yong-gun
 
 
 Cha Yeong-ok
 Lee Sang-hyeok

References 

2003 films
2000s Korean-language films
2003 romantic comedy films
South Korean romantic comedy films
2000s South Korean films